Bangecuo (also spelled as Bangor Co) is a graben basin salt lake on the Tibetan Plateau in Xainza County within Nagqu in the Tibet Autonomous Region of China.

It was reported in 2003 that the water levels of Siling Lake and Bangecuo had increased by 19.34% since 1969.

Siling Lake is another nearby salt lake located west of Bangecuo, around four miles away.

See also

 Dazecuo
 Gomang Co
 Lake Urru
 Namtso

References

Further reading
 Lv, P., Qu, Y. G., Li, W. Q., & Wang, H. S. (2003). "Shelincuo and Bangecuo extensional lake basins in the northern part of Tibet and present chasmic activities." Jilin Geol, 22, 15–19.

External links
 Li Pu, (1955). "Bangecuo Formation". Chinese Science Bulletin. Chapter 9. . DOI: 10.1007/978-3-540-93824-8_362

Lakes of Tibet
Xainza County
Saline lakes of Asia